Sekam (also Romanized as Sekām; also known as Seh Kām) is a village in Khoshabar Rural District, in the Central District of Rezvanshahr County, Gilan Province, Iran. At the 2006 census, its population was 417, in 112 families.

References 

Populated places in Rezvanshahr County